Robi Axiata Limited, doing business as Robi, is the second largest mobile network operator in Bangladesh currently  owned by two major stakeholders being Axiata and Bharti Airtel. In this company, Axiata of Malaysia holds a major controlling stake of 61.82%, Bharti Airtel of India holds 28.18%, and remaining 10% stake is hold by investors in DSE and CSE.

Robi first commenced operation in 1997 as Telekom Malaysia International (Bangladesh) with the brand name ‘AKTEL’. In 2010 the company was re-branded to ‘Robi’ and the company changed its name to Robi Axiata Limited. Robi Axiata has spectrum on GSM 900, 1800 and 2100 MHz bands.

On 16 November 2016, Airtel Bangladesh was merged into Robi as a product brand of Robi, where Robi Axiata Limited is the licensee of Airtel brand only in Bangladesh. Having successfully completed the merger process, Robi has emerged as the second largest mobile phone operator in Bangladesh.
Controversies:

History

Robi Axiata Limited started as a joint venture company between Telekom Malaysia and AK Khan and Company. It was formerly known as Telekom Malaysia International Bangladesh Limited which commenced operations in Bangladesh in 1997 with the brand name 'AKTEL'. In 2007, AK Khan and Company exited the business by selling its 30% stake to Japan's NTT Docomo for US$350 million.

On 28 March 2010, 'AKTEL' was rebranded as 'Robi' which means "sun" in Bengali. It also took the logo of parent company Axiata Group which itself also went through a major rebranding in 2009. In 2013, after five years of presence, Docomo reduced its ownership to 8% for Axiata to take 92%.

On 28 January 2016, it was announced that Robi Axiata and Airtel Bangladesh will merge in Q1 2016. The combined entity will be called Robi, to serve about 40 million subscribers combined by both networks. Axiata Group will own 68.3% share, while Bharti Group will own 25%, and NTT Docomo held 6.31% shares. Finally Robi and Airtel were merged on 16 November 2016 and Robi set sail as the merged company. Later on, in 2020, after a decade with Robi, NTT Docomo decided to leave Bangladesh by selling its remaining stake in Robi Axiata Limited to Bharti International.

In August 2021, CEO Mahtab Uddin Ahmed stepped down as Robi CEO.  Company CFO M Riyaaz Rasheed stepped in as acting CEO in addition to his current duties.

Mobile network operator Robi Axiata Limited has appointed Rajeev Sethi as the company’s chief executive officer from October, 2022. He will be replacing M Riyaaz Rasheed, who has been serving as Robi’s acting chief executive officer since August 2021.

Achievements
In 2009, then AKTEL, now Robi Axiata, was the first operator to introduce GPRS and 3.5G services in the country. It is the first company to launch 4.5G service in all the 64 districts of the country. Robi also claims to have the widest international roaming coverage with 398 operators across 182 countries with widest 4G roaming footprint in 29 countries with 40 operators. Robi has clearly pioneered in the domain of mEducation with the creation of the largest online school of the country, Robi-10 Minute School, which is providing quality educational content to millions of students across the country for free of cost. Among many awards it has won nationally and internationally, the prestigious GSMA Glomo award for the Best Mobile Innovation for Education and Learning in the "Connected Life Awards" category at the Mobile World Congress (MWC) 2017, is highly noteworthy.

Numbering scheme

Robi uses the following numbering scheme for its subscribers:

+880 16 XXXXXXXX

+880 18 XXXXXXXX

Where, +880 is the International subscriber dialing code for Bangladesh.

18 and 16 is the access code for Robi as assigned by the Government of Bangladesh. Omitting +88 will require to use 0 in place of it instead to represent local call, hence 018 and 016 is the general access code.

N1N2N3N4N5N6N7N8 is the subscriber number.

After merger with airtel, besides '018', Robi owns '016' number series too.

New system and regulations that: Any operator of (017-013)(019-014)(015) can change his operators by MNP.....

Network 
Robi is currently the second largest mobile operator in Bangladesh in terms of total number of mobile towers or BTS. As of October 2021, Robi has a total of 13,812 BTS towers across the country.

Mobile services
Robi offers an array of different packages. In addition to offering the fundamental pre-paid and post-paid mobile services, it offers a wide range of value-added products and services such as, SMS, GPRS, EDGE, 3.5G HSPA+, 4.5G, LTE-A, Fixed Broadband, international roaming, Mobile Banking, SMS banking, Caller Ring Back Tone, MMS, Voice Greetings, Welcome Tunes etc. Robi has got the widest international roaming coverage among all the operators in Bangladesh.

Digital services
Robi provides different digital services. They are -

bdapps - Bangladesh's national app store
BDTICKETS - Bangladesh's largest online ticketing platform
Binge - Live TV & video streaming service. Built by Raskenlund and powered by RedDot Digital
Binge Box - Android TV set-top box
Duronto Browser - Bangladesh's first bangla web browser
Funflix - video streaming service powered by Bongo
GAME HUB - Online game store powered by E.B.Solutions
Islamic Portal - Islamic content service
Kuuk TV - video streaming service powered by Bongo
My Drive - Cloud storage powered by Funambol
Noor - Digital Islamic content service powered by Gakk Media
Robi2u - Marketing agency
Robi Apps Club - Subscription-based app store. Powered by Bemobi
Robi BoiGhor - eBook reader
Robi Intelligent Cam Pro - Online camera controller
Robi Intelligent Solutions - Smart home controller
Robi My Sports - Online Live sports service
Robi MyPlay - Online gaming service powered by Gakk Media
Robi Screen - video streaming service
Robi VTS - Vehicle Tracker
RobiCash - Digital wallet
Robishop - Online shopping
RobiTV+ - Live TV service powered by Bongo
Treasure Wars - Bangladeshi environment-based real-time battle royale game. Built by Riseup Labs
WINit - #1 quiz game in Bangladesh

References

Axiata
Mobile phone companies of Bangladesh
NTT Docomo
Companies established in 1997
Telecommunications companies of Bangladesh
Bharti Airtel